Koehl, also transliterated Köhl, is an Upper German surname constituting a metaphonic variant of the Standard German surname Kohl, derived from the cognate word kohl, meaning cabbage. It tends to originate as an occupational name for a cultivator or merchant of the crops.

People
 Albert Koehl (born 1959), Canadian lawyer and writer
 Albert Köhl (1879–1954), German-Swedish chef de cuisine
 Dan Koehl (born 1959), French-Swedish elephant trainer
 Denis Koehl (born 1956), French general and aviator
 Ditmar Koel (1500–1563), German politician
 Émile Koehl (1921–2013), French politician
 Georg Köhl (1910–1944), German football player
 Hermann Köhl (1888–1938), German aviator
 Laurent Koehl (born 1971), French tenor
 M. A. R. Koehl (born 1948), American marine biologist and Professor at University of California, Berkeley
 Matthias Koehl (1935–2014), American U.S. Marine, and political activist
 Michael Köhl, Professor of Physics at the University of Bonn
 Keith Koehl, American Catholic prelate
 Patrice Koehl, French-American Professor in computer science at University of California, Davis
 Robert B. Koehl, American archaeologist
 Robert Lewis Koehl (1922-2015), U.S. Army Intelligence surveyor, and Professor Emeritus of history at the University of Wisconsin-Madison
 Wade Koehl (born 1984), American football player

Other
 Koehl Lab, Department of Integrative Biology, University of California, Berkeley

References 

German-language surnames
Surnames of French origin
Swiss-German surnames